Strike Commander is a combat flight simulation video game designed by Chris Roberts and released by Origin Systems for the PC DOS in 1993. Its 3D graphics-engine used both gouraud shading and texture-mapping on both aircraft-models and terrain, an impressive feat at the time. Significant plot elements were presented through in-game cut-scene animations, a hallmark storytelling vehicle from Chris Robert's previous Wing Commander games. Strike Commander has been called "Privateer on Earth," due to the mercenary role-playing in the game.

The game was mass released in 1994 as part of a Creative Labs bundle pack with Syndicate Plus, Ultima VIII: Pagan and Wing Commander II: Vengeance of the Kilrathi. It was also available in a CD bundle with Wing Commander: Privateer; both games included the core game, the expansion pack and voice pack on a single CD-ROM disc.

The game was re-released in 2013 on Gog.com with support for Windows and macOS.

Gameplay
The player accepts missions from interesting characters and gets paid for doing them which allows the player to buy more weapons. The missions involve flying an F-16 Fighting Falcon and, in the last missions of the game, the more advanced F-22, while accomplishing certain objectives and missions.

Other simulators, such as the F-22 series from Novalogic have been compared with Strike Commander because of their simplified flight model and emphasis on graphic detail, which makes them relatively similar in terms of philosophy.

Plot

Setting 
The game takes place in the then-near-future 2011. The end of the Cold War and the Gulf War have triggered a massive rise in global instability, compounded by natural disasters and failed economic policy in the United States. Capitalizing on the growing need for security, the Turkish government allows private security contractors to operate with near-complete freedom from Istanbul provided they register with the Ministry of Foreign Affairs for a regular fee.

The protagonist is the newest pilot in the Wildcats, a private security company specializing in air combat led by James Stern. Although the Wildcats are a veteran squadron, the company has struggled to keep pilots on its roster as of late, owing primarily to Stern's strict policy against civilian casualties. The Wildcats' biggest rival is the Jackals, led by Stern's former second-in-command Jean-Paul Prideaux.

History

Development 
The Strike Commander project took more than four years and over a million man hours on background development. Very little of that production time turned out to be actually usable in the final product, as at least one and possibly several complete project "reboots" were required to refine the graphical engine to a playable state. Nevertheless, some successful gameplay elements from Strike Commander were re-used by other more notable Origin products such as Privateer and the Wing Commander series. Chris Roberts, in the game's manual, compares the game's long development time with the events in the 1991 documentary Hearts of Darkness: A Filmmaker's Apocalypse, a film account of what it took to get the 1979 film Apocalypse Now made.

Release 
A separate Speech Pack, sold on floppy disk, replaced some of the game's text-dialogue with voice-acted recordings. An expansion pack Strike Commander: Tactical Operations continued the game's story by adding more missions and flyable aircraft. A later CD-ROM edition of Strike Commander bundled the game, expansion pack, and more audio content (beyond what was available in the Speech Pack).	 
	
In March 2013 Strike Commander was re-released in the Digital Distribution by gog.com.
	 
In 2013 a SC reverse engineering project by Fabien Sanglard with a reconstructed source code variant became available on GitHub as the original source code was most probably lost in the take over of Origin by EA ("abandonware").

Reception
In August 1993 Computer Gaming World stated that "Strike is not and does not attempt to be a high-fidelity simulation ... It focuses on action and combat" and "is designed to get players in the air and having fun in the shortest amount of time", with a "much gentler learning curve" than Falcon 3.0 or Red Baron and better graphics than F-117 Stealth Fighter 2.0 or Jetfighter. In December the magazine described the game as "probably the most hardware-intensive game yet released". In April 1994 the magazine said that the CD version's additional difficulty levels, improvement to the "admittedly enhanced combat sequences" including a more realistic F-16 flight model, and the expansion missions made it "the best option".

In 1994, PC Gamer UK named Strike Commanders CD-ROM release the 36th best computer game of all time. The editors called it "the game as it should have been in the first place, and [...] one of the best CD titles so far." In 1996, Computer Gaming World ranked Strike Commander as the 13th top vaporware title in computer game history (due 1991, delivered 1993), stating "The haze you see from the cockpit is emblematic of this title's troubled development on the bleeding edge of technology."

See also 
 Pacific Strike
 Wings of Glory
  Falcon 4.0

References

External links
 

1993 video games
DOS games
Combat flight simulators
FM Towns games
Games commercially released with DOSBox
MacOS games
NEC PC-9801 games
Origin Systems games
Video games developed in the United States
Video games scored by Dana Karl Glover
Video games scored by Martin Galway
Video games set in 2011
Windows games